Florakis (Greek: Φλωράκης) is a Greek surname. Notable people with the surname include:

Charilaos Florakis (1914–2005), leader of the Communist Party of Greece
Evangelos Florakis (1943–2002), Greek Army officer

Greek-language surnames
Surnames of Greek origin